Bowenia serrulata, the Byfield fern, is a cycad in the family Stangeriaceae. Its bipinnate fronds, arising from a subterranean caudex, give it the appearance of a fern. However it is not a fern as its vernacular name and appearance suggest. It is endemic to the vicinity of Byfield, Australia.

Gallery

References

External Links

serrulata
Endemic flora of Australia
Cycadophyta of Australia
Flora of Queensland
Least concern flora of Australia
Least concern biota of Queensland
Taxonomy articles created by Polbot